is a railway station on the Rinkai Line in Shinagawa, Tokyo, Japan, operated by the third-sector railway operating company Tokyo Waterfront Area Rapid Transit (TWR).

Lines

Station layout

The underground station concourse is located on the basement ("1BF") level, and the single island platform is located on the third-basement ("3BF") level, serving two tracks. There are three entrances to the station: "A" at the north end, and "B" and "C" at the south end.

Platforms

History
The station opened on 1 December 2002.

Station numbering was introduced in 2016 with Shinagawa Seaside being assigned station number R06.

Platform screen doors became operational on platform 1 on 8 February 2022. The ones on platform 2 are scheduled to become operational on 13 March 2022.

Passenger statistics
In fiscal 2011, the station was used by an average of 20,917 passengers daily.

Surrounding area

Entrance A
 Tepco Oi power station
 Tokai Junior High School

Entrance B
 Shinagawa Seaside Park
 Advanced Institute of Industrial Technology

Entrance C
 Shinagawa Seaside TS Tower
 Hotel Sun Route Shinagawa Seaside

See also

 List of railway stations in Japan

References

External links

 

TWR Rinkai Line
Stations of Tokyo Waterfront Area Rapid Transit
Railway stations in Tokyo
Railway stations in Japan opened in 2002